Pierre-Yves Eberle (born 25 February 1968), citizen in Geneva, is a Swiss swimmer and lieutenant colonel in the Swiss Air Force

Tasks within the Swiss Army 
Lieutenant-Colonel in the General Staff, Pierre-Yves Eberle is the chief of the Operations Center Air Force of the Swiss Army. Subject to him are the areas: ARABELLA / HQ Support / Security, deployment leadership Luftwaffe, deployment planning Air Force, deployment support Air Force, use control aircraft NSF and air transport service of the Federation.

Pierre-Yves Eberle is a professional military pilot and was a member of PC-7 Team in Berufsfliegerkorps and in 1999. He was Fleet Chief F / A-18, Project Manager of the Volltruppenübung Stabante from 3 to 7 October 2011. He flies the Pilatus PC-7, Northrop F-5E, Northrop F-5F and the Fliegerstaffel 18 the F/A-18C and F/A-18D.

1988 Summer Olympics 
He competed in two events at the  two events of the 1988 Summer Olympics.

References

External links
 

1968 births
Living people
Swiss male swimmers
Olympic swimmers of Switzerland
Swimmers at the 1988 Summer Olympics
Place of birth missing (living people)
Swiss military officers
Swiss aviators
Swiss Air Force personnel